Yosif Ayuba (born 30 November 1990) is a Swedish footballer of Beninese descent who plays as a defender and midfielder. He plays for Huddinge IF.

Career 

Ayuba came from Vasalunds IF to Djurgårdens IF in June 2009 and debuted against Helsingborgs IF on 5 July. He started to play organized football in 2007, when he came to Sweden from Benin. He scored his first goal in Allsvenskan on 28 October away against Helsingborgs IF. In January 2011, Ayuba suffered a blood clot in one of his calves, which put him in rehab for at least six months.

References

External links 
 
 

1990 births
Djurgårdens IF Fotboll players
Beninese footballers
Swedish footballers
Living people
Swedish people of Beninese descent
Swedish sportspeople of African descent
Vasalunds IF players
AFC Eskilstuna players
Allsvenskan players
Association football defenders